Up (styled as UP by EL AL) was a low-cost airline brand of Israeli El Al. El Al announced in January 2018 that UP will cease operations in October 2018 to be remerged into El Al.

History
On 26 November 2013, El Al unveiled its new low-cost airline Up, which commenced operations on 30 March 2014, initially to Berlin, Budapest, Kyiv, Larnaca and Prague using five Boeing 737-800s transferred from the El Al mainline fleet. Up was founded by its parent El Al to be used on some routes to Europe where it replaced El Al itself. All flights of Up are operated by El Al, using El Al's call sign and codes with a four digit number. For flights over two hours the airline offers a buy on board service.

In August 2014, Ryanair CEO Michael O'Leary foreshadowed the development of a Ryanair Israel, connecting Israel with cities across Europe. He said an inhibiting factor in the plan was Israeli authorities protectiveness of El Al from competition. The CEO of Up wishes to recreate the airline business world.

In January 2018 it was announced that El Al were to discontinue the Up brand. Up was planned to cease operations by October 2018 and all flights and aircraft would return to El Al. El Al therefore introduced a new fare structure to replace the Up offers. The last flights took place on 14 October 2018.

Destinations
Up had been served the following destinations until 14 October 2018:

Fleet

References

External links

2013 establishments in Israel
2018 disestablishments in Israel
Airlines established in 2013
Airlines disestablished in 2018
Defunct airlines of Israel
El Al